Thomas Hansen Collins (born 25 June 1946) is a former admiral of the United States Coast Guard who served as the 22nd commandant from May 2002 to May 2006.

Early life and education
A native of Stoughton, Massachusetts, Collins graduated from the U.S. Coast Guard Academy in 1968 and later served as a faculty member within the Humanities Department. He earned a Master of Arts degree in Liberal Studies from Wesleyan University and a Master of Business Administration from the University of New Haven.

Career

U.S. Coast Guard
Collins started his U.S. Coast Guard career as a deck watch officer and first lieutenant aboard the cutter Vigilant. Following that assignment, he served a two-year tour as commanding officer of the cutter , a patrol boat homeported in Charleston, South Carolina. His shore operational assignments include Deputy Commander, Group St. Petersburg, Florida, and Commander of Coast Guard Group and Captain of the Port, Long Island Sound, in New Haven, Connecticut.

Prior to his promotion to Flag Officer in 1994, he served as Chief, Programs Division at Coast Guard Headquarters, and then as Deputy Chief of Staff of the Coast Guard.

From 1998 to 2000 he served as Commander, Pacific Area and Eleventh Coast Guard District, where he developed the successful Coast Guard response to the increase in illegal drug and migrant smuggling traffic in the Eastern Pacific. His other flag assignments include serving as Commander, Fourteenth Coast Guard District in Honolulu, Hawaii and Chief, Office of Acquisition at Coast Guard Headquarters where he managed the acquisition of twelve major systems worth nearly $3 billion and laid the foundation for the ill-fated Integrated Deepwater System project, which was intended to modernize the ships, aircraft and sensors that the Coast Guard uses to perform its many open ocean missions.

Vice-Commandant of the U.S. Coast Guard
Prior to becoming Commandant, Collins served as Vice Commandant of the United States Coast Guard, the number two post, from 2000 to 2002 where he created the Innovation Council, spearheaded service-wide process improvement initiatives and directed system enhancements as the Coast Guard Acquisition Executive.

Commandant of the U.S. Coast Guard
Collins served as the 22nd Commandant of the Coast Guard from May 2002 to May 2006, and guided the U.S. Coast Guard in the aftermath of the September 11 attacks of 2001. As part of this effort to tighten maritime security, Collins encouraged people involved in the maritime industry and the recreational boating industry to report suspicious activity to the National Response Center. This program was extended and formalized as America's Waterway Watch in 2005.

Other activities
Collins has served as a director on the boards of numerous companies such as EID Passport Inc., USIS Inc., and Terma North America, and the U.S. Coast Guard Foundation. He consults in areas of national security and maritime security, safety, and environmental protection.

He served on the board of SPADAC  from 2007 to 2010 as a key independent director, having been recruited by CEO Mark Dumas to provide balance to the board after SPADAC raised $7.5M in Venture Capital.  SPADAC later was renamed to GeoEye Analytics, Inc. after its acquisition then ultimately DigitalGlobe Analytics, Inc. (NYSE: DGI).

Personal life

Awards and decorations

References

External links

This article contains information from the United States Coast Guard, and by US public law, is in the public domain.

1946 births
Living people
Commandants of the United States Coast Guard
Vice Commandants of the United States Coast Guard
United States Coast Guard admirals
Recipients of the Transportation Distinguished Service Medal
Recipients of the Homeland Security Distinguished Service Medal
Recipients of the Defense Distinguished Service Medal
Recipients of the Coast Guard Distinguished Service Medal
Recipients of the Legion of Merit
United States Coast Guard Academy alumni
Wesleyan University alumni
University of New Haven alumni
People from Stoughton, Massachusetts
Recipients of the Humanitarian Service Medal
Military personnel from Massachusetts